is a member of the Japanese Communist Party serving in the House of Representatives. She is supportive of foreigner suffrage, giving foreigners living in Japan the right to vote, citing that the foreigners pay taxes and are a part of Japanese communities. She also supports the creation of a committee that would protect the human rights of foreign workers, as the current body, the International Training Cooperation Organization, has income that comes from the companies that commit violations of human rights of the foreign workers.

References

1972 births
Living people
Japanese communists
Japanese Communist Party politicians
Members of the House of Representatives (Japan)